The First Baptist Church is a historic church at 346 Main Street in Yarmouth, Maine, United States.  The congregation was established in 1796 at the nearby North Yarmouth and Freeport Baptist Meetinghouse. It moved to its current location in 1889.

The building was designed by noted architect John Calvin Stevens. Its clock was a donation, added after the completion of the church.

References

External links 
 Official website

Churches in Yarmouth, Maine
Churches completed in 1889
19th-century churches in the United States